Lookingglass is an unincorporated community and census-designated place in the Lookingglass Valley of Douglas County, Oregon, United States, about  southwest of Roseburg. As of the 2010 census it had a population of 855. Lookingglass is considered a suburb of Roseburg.

History
The valley was named in 1846 by surveyor Hoy Flournoy, who said the beautiful green grass of the valley reflected light almost as well as a mirror. Flournoy later returned to settle in the area.

The Lookingglass Store, built in 1852, was once the terminus for the Oakland to Lookingglass stage and freight road. It was also the beginning of the Coos Bay Wagon Road. Today the store continues to serve as the hub of the community and is the oldest business in Douglas County. Lookingglass also has a school, a grange hall, a church and a fire station. Lookingglass post office closed in 1942.

In the 1970s, Lookingglass, population 40 at the time, received national media attention for installing a two-horse parking meter, a telephone booth, and a fire hydrant. Lookingglass became a minor tourist attraction. When the fire hydrant was dedicated in 1971, it was accompanied by two manhole covers, which covered nothing, donated by a Eugene, Oregon iron company and the mayor of Cedar Rapids, Iowa.

David Brinkley anchored his segment of the NBC Nightly News from the steps of the Lookingglass Store in 1974, while passing through Oregon to do a series of short news stories. Chet Huntley, David Brinkley's co-anchor of the Huntley-Brinkley Report, was the great-grandson of the Lookingglass area's first settler, Daniel Huntley, who arrived in 1851.

The James Wimer Octagonal Barn near Lookingglass was built in 1892 and is listed on the National Register of Historic Places.

Geography
Lookingglass is located in west-central Douglas County in the valley of Lookingglass Creek, a tributary of the South Umpqua River.

Demographics

Climate
This region experiences warm (but not hot) and dry summers, with no average monthly temperatures above 71.6 °F.  According to the Köppen Climate Classification system, Lookingglass has a warm-summer Mediterranean climate, abbreviated "Csb" on climate maps.

The USDA Plant Hardiness map lists Lookingglass as being in zone 8b.

Education
Lookingglass Elementary School is part of the Winston-Dillard School District. It was founded in 1898 and currently serves grades kindergarten through six.

See also
Lookingglass Airport

References

External links
Historic images of Lookingglass from Salem Public Library
Images of the James Wimer octagonal barn in Lookingglass from University of Oregon Digital Collections

1870s establishments in Oregon
Census-designated places in Oregon
Unincorporated communities in Douglas County, Oregon
Census-designated places in Douglas County, Oregon
Unincorporated communities in Oregon